Stoked may refer to:

Stoked (video game), an Xbox 360 game
Stoked (TV series), a Canadian comedy cartoon
Stoked: The Rise and Fall of Gator, a documentary
Stoked (instrumental), on The Beach Boys album Surfin' U.S.A.
Stoked (Website), an extreme sports social networking website